WRBL (channel 3) is a television station in Columbus, Georgia, United States, affiliated with CBS and owned by Nexstar Media Group. Its studios are located on 13th Avenue in Columbus, and its transmitter is located in Cusseta.

History
WRBL first went on the air on November 15, 1953—just over a month after NBC affiliate WDAK-TV (channel 28, now WTVM on channel 9). It is Georgia's third-oldest station outside of Atlanta (after Macon's WMAZ-TV) as well as the second-oldest in Columbus. It would have been the fourth-oldest in Georgia, had WROM-TV, channel 9 in Rome not moved to Chattanooga, Tennessee in 1958, rebranded as WTVC. WRBL-TV was owned by Jim Woodruff along with WRBL radio (AM 1420, now WRCG, and FM 102.9, now WVRK). Originally on channel 4, it moved to channel 3 in 1960 as part of a regional frequency reallocation by the FCC, that saw WTVM move to channel 9 and WTVY in Dothan, Alabama move to channel 4. Ironically, the same company, Martin Theaters of Georgia, that purchased and moved WROM-TV and its channel 9 to Chattanooga, had also purchased WDAK-TV and oversaw its switch to the channel 9 VHF hi-band frequency in Columbus.

The station has always been a CBS affiliate owing to its radio sister's long affiliation with CBS Radio, but shared ABC with WTVM until the channel switch of 1960, when WTVM switched to ABC to get in line with then co-owned WTVC, also on channel 9. At that time, WRBL began sharing NBC with WTVM. WRBL is the only major station in Columbus that has never changed its original affiliation. Columbus was one of the very few two-station markets in the 1960s without its own primary NBC affiliate, although NBC affiliates in Albany, Atlanta and Montgomery could be picked up with relative ease. WYEA (channel 38, now WLTZ) took over the NBC affiliation when it opened in October 1970.

Woodruff owned the station until his death in a car crash in 1978. After his death, banks controlled the station until it was bought by Malcolm Glazer's Avant Corporation of Rochester, New York. He sold it to TCS Television Partners, who, in turn, sold it to Spartan Communications in 1995. Spartan later merged its company with Media General in 2000.

WRBL replaced RTV with MeTV on digital subchannel 3.2 on September 26, 2011, as part of a groupwide affiliation agreement with Media General; the channel replaced RTV on some Media General-owned stations in other markets.

In early 2016, WRBL relaunched 3.3 as the Ion affiliate for the Chattahoochee Valley. 3.3 had been dark since the station closed the First Alert 24/7 Weather channel.

On January 11, 2017, Media General became part of the Nexstar Media Group.

On September 6, 2018, WRBL opened a news bureau on Columbus State University's downtown campus. The bureau is housed inside CSU's Carpenter Building. The bureau will allow interns from CSU to work alongside WRBL's news staff.

Programming

Syndicated programming
Syndicated programming on WRBL includes Judge Mathis, The People's Court, Wheel of Fortune, and Jeopardy!

News operation
WRBL presently broadcasts 22 hours of locally produced newscasts each week (with four hours each weekday and one hour each on Saturdays and Sundays).

Due to economic conditions from 2008 through 2009, WRBL's owner Media General enacted a series of staff reductions that noticeably affected the amount of news that WRBL offered. First, 6:00 p.m. weekend newscasts were canceled in fall 2008, and the remaining weekend newscasts were eliminated in early 2009. Soon after, the 5:00 p.m. and noon newscasts were dropped. However, as of August 2010, the noon newscast has been added back to the WRBL lineup. On October 17, 2010, WRBL reinstated the Sunday night edition of News 3 Nightwatch. Unlike the previous newscasts that were canceled, the duties of these newscasts are spread throughout remaining staff members, including the anchor team. On September 12, 2011, the station revived News 3 First Edition weekdays at 5:00 p.m. On September 14, 2013, WRBL revived the Saturday edition of News 3 Nightwatch at 11:00 and on September 29, 2013, WRBL added a Sunday edition of News 3 Evening Edition at 6:30 p.m. WRBL launched high definition newscasts on March 21, 2014, with News 3 Nightwatch at 12:30 a.m. (ran late after NCAA March Madness coverage).

Notable former on-air staff
 Rece Davis – sports director; now at ESPN
 Janice Huff – meteorologist/science reporter; now chief meteorologist at WNBC and Weekend Today (1996–2012)
 Anne Montgomery – sports reporter (early–mid-1980s); later at ESPN; now a teacher at South Mountain High School in Phoenix, Arizona

Subchannels
The station's digital signal is multiplexed:

References

External links
 
 MeTV Columbus website

CBS network affiliates
Rewind TV affiliates
Ion Television affiliates
Laff (TV network) affiliates
Television channels and stations established in 1953
RBL
1953 establishments in Georgia (U.S. state)
Nexstar Media Group